Petr Linhart (born 29 May 1990) is a Czech handball player. He plays for Fenix Toulouse and the Czech national team. He participated at the 2015 World Men's Handball Championship in Qatar.

References

1990 births
Living people
People from Zruč nad Sázavou
Czech male handball players
Sportspeople from the Central Bohemian Region